John Mullan is a professor of English at University College London. He is a specialist in eighteenth-century literature, currently writing the 1709-1784 volume of the Oxford English Literary History.

He has written a weekly column on contemporary fiction for The Guardian and reviews for the London Review of Books and the New Statesman. He has been a contributor to BBC Two's Newsnight Review and BBC Radio 4's In Our Time. He was a The Best of the Booker judge in 2008 and for the Man Booker Prize itself in 2009.

Educated at Downside School and King's College, Cambridge, he was a research fellow at Jesus College, Cambridge and a lecturer at Fitzwilliam College, Cambridge, before moving to UCL in 1994.

Selected bibliography
 Robinson Crusoe (ed.) (Longman, 1992) 
 Eighteenth-century Popular Culture: A Selection (ed. with Christopher Reid) (Oxford University Press, 2000) 
 How Novels Work (Oxford University Press, 2006) 
 Lyrical Ballads (foreword) (Longman, 2007) 
 Anonymity: A Secret History of English Literature (Princeton University Press, 2008) 
 What Matters in Jane Austen?: Twenty Crucial Puzzles Solved (Bloomsbury Publishing, 7 Jun 2012)

References

External links
 John Mullan's page at UCL
 John Mullan's articles in The Guardian

Alumni of King's College, Cambridge
Academics of University College London
Fellows of Fitzwilliam College, Cambridge
Fellows of Jesus College, Cambridge
People educated at Downside School
Year of birth missing (living people)
Living people